is a Japanese Tokusatsu television series. It was Toei Company's fourteenth installment of the Super Sentai metaseries. It aired on TV Asahi from March 2, 1990, to February 8, 1991, with a total of 48 episodes replacing Kousoku Sentai Turboranger and was replaced by Chōjin Sentai Jetman. The name given by Toei for international distribution is Sky Rangers. 

It was released by Shout! Factory on Region 1 DVD on September 6, 2022, as part of Shout! Factory’s new partnership with Hasbro. It originally was teased to be released in 2019. This is the second Super Sentai series to be officially released in North America that does not have a Power Rangers counterpart. The first one released was Chōjin Sentai Jetman, which was the series that came out the year following Fiveman. Jetman was released in the region on September 25, 2018.

Plot
In 1970, Doctor Hoshikawa was researching how to transform the planet Sedon into a green, lush world, testing it by attempting to grow flowers. On the day the first flower bloomed, the Zone Empire launched an assault on the planet, separating him and his wife from their five children. Arthur G6 took the five children back to Earth and raised them while after the attack, Doctor Hoshikawa safely went to Planet P16 Milky way.

Twenty years later, the five are now teachers at the same school, the Newtown Elementary School (Newtown Shougakko). The Galactic Imperial Army Zone led by Empress Meadow and Captain Garoa now prepares to invade Earth as its thousandth target to destroy for immortality of Empress Meadow (it was later revealed that Empress Meadow is an illusion used by Vulgyre, their base which is also a gigantic lifeform monster to manipulate them in order to be a "god"). As they begin the attack, three vehicles appear and counter the offensive. Five warriors descend from the vehicles and confront Zone.

The Hoshikawa siblings have been developing the Fiveman technology and training hard upon the possibility of Zone invading Earth. Now the five siblings are ready to battle with the familiar foes as Fiveman.

Characters

Fivemen

The Fivemen are the first Super Sentai group to consist entirely of siblings. The five siblings of the Hoshikawa family (three brothers and two sisters), were separated from their parents during a sudden Zone attack, sent to board a ship along with Arthur G6 to be raised and learn of the Fiveman technology. They pose as teachers at New Town School, planting a garden of Sidon Flowers which they brought from planet Sidon.

 /: He is the eldest and leader of the team at 27 years old. He is a Science teacher (Episode 1,16 and 38) skilled in kendo (Episode 40). He was 7 at the time of the Zone's attack on Sidon. Calm, responsible and a strict teacher (Episode 40), he had the task of raising his four younger siblings along with Arthur G6, making him not just a big brother but also a leader and a parental figure. Out of fear, he fired a gun at Garoa's face, scarring him, creating a rivalry between the two. Even though he is a reliable and brave leader, he has a major weakness with the supernatural (Episode 41).
His helmet has the science symbol (an atom) on the front, and the triangle-shaped visor having no stripes indicates him being the first member.
 Weapons: , 
 Attacks: 
 /: The second born at 25 years old. He is a  Physical education teacher skilled in judo. The second in command of Fiveman. Although reckless (Episode 2 and 44), He is extremely passionate in everything he does, relies more in the body combat than in weapons (Episode 20 and 38). He even taught one of his students the meaning of courage by defeating a foe without transforming (Episode 20). He can also lift heavy objects, even monsters in fighting. 
His helmet has a P.E. symbol (loosely derived from the swimming symbol) on the front, and the white horizontal stripe splitting the diamond-shaped visor into two parts indicates him being the second member.
 Attacks: 
 /: The fourth born, youngest son and twin brother of Remi at 20 years old. He is a Japanese teacher skilled in karate (Episode 39). He has a wide range knowledge of various languages, even alien ones. He can read alien languages (Episode 31) and speak and understand alien languages (Episodes 2, 5 and 7) Despite this, he tends to be childish and reckless like Ken (Episode 2 and 32) and sometimes ill-tempered(Episodes 14, 32, 36 and 38) and clumsy (Episode 26, 36 and 43). He is thoughtful (Episode 14 and 16) and good in spy-warfare (Episode 23 and 38), stunts and sometimes fight without transformation (Episode 10, 16, 23, 38 and 43). In episode 43, he teaches Yoshio-Kun the meaning of having playmates. He and Remi were only 1 year old during the attack on Sidon, therefore they continuously suffer for not remembering their parent's faces. 
His helmet has  (the kanji for "language") on the front, and two white diagonal stripes forming a "V" and splitting the half-circle-shaped visor into three parts indicates him being the third member.
 Attacks: 
 /: The third born and oldest daughter at 23 years old. She is a Math teacher skilled in fencing. Sometimes, tagged as "Old maid" (Episode 16 and 41). Calm and intelligent, she can analyze and calculate with her "computer like" brain. She was three years old at the time of the attack on Sidon and remembers nothing but fear which she had to overcome to do battle with Zone as an adult. Protective and caring, she is a maternal figure to Fumiya and Remi (Episode 5 and 17). She may be considered as strict (Episode 7, 18 and 42) but practical (Episode 42) but willing to sacrifice (Episode 18 and 32) and in charge of household on Magma Base with Arthur G6 (Episode 7, 10 and 42) 
Her helmet has a unique math symbol (a combination of the addition, subtraction, multiplication, and division symbols) on the front, and three white horizontal stripes splitting the heart-shaped visor into four parts indicates her being the fourth member.
 Weapons: , 
 Attacks: 
 /: The twin sister of Fumiya and the youngest of the Hoshikawa siblings at 20 years old. A music teacher skilled in kung fu. She is disastrous at housekeeping and cleaning tasks which she leaves to either Kazumi or Arthur (Episode 42). She has excellent rhythm and musical senses (Episode 1 and 13), she is also a rhythmic gymnast and dancer (Episode 34), which she applies to her fighting. She teaches children kung-fu in her spare time. In episode 4, she got drunk when water was turned into alcohol, yet she fought using the Drunken Fist and defeated the galactic warrior.  During the events of Kaizoku Sentai Gokaiger, she appeared and granted the Greater Power of the Fiveman to the Gokaigers. She would appear in the final episode of the series receiving the Five Yellow Ranger Key as the Gokaigers depart Earth. 
Her helmet has a single eighth note on the front, and four white horizontal stripes splitting the pentagon-shaped visor into five parts indicates her being the fifth member.
 Weapons: , 
 Attacks:

Arsenal
 : Fiveman's transformation devices. The individual Fivemen transform by shouting out their code names, while the gathered team shouts the team name.
 : Wristband changers used by Gaku, Ken, and Fumiya.
 : Pendant changers used by Kazumi and Remi.
: The team's sidearm, which transform from a gun to a sword with a detachable . It can also modify each Fiveman's assigned weapon:
 V Shuttler: Five Red's shortened V-Sword.
 Twin Risbees: Five Blue's Twin Array that has been separated into frisbees.
 Twin Yo-yos: Shrunken Twin Risbees.
 Black Jaw: Five Black's transformed Power Cutter.
 Circle Puter: Five Pink's transformed Cutie Circle.
 Yellow Flute: Five Yellow's transformed Melody Tact.

Group Techniques
 : An armor developed by Gaku and Arthur G6 (Episode 37) to defeat Chevalier, It is composed of Shoulder Guards, Arm Shields, and Power Leggers. All this increases strength fivefold. It was first used by Five Blue to defeat a gigantic IED Galactic warrior, However, He only used this technique once (Episode 37, 38 and 45). Five Red also used this technique twice (Episode 38 and 45)and mostly by Five Black (Episode 38, 43 and 45)
: When needed, Arthur would fly from Magma Base to the Fiveman and transform into Earth Cannon. The Fiveman shout  and as Arthur shouts  fires a 10,000 degree fire beam. Earth Cannon cannot be used if the five are not together.
: As with Gorenger's "Gorenger Storm" or Sun Vulcan's "Vulcan Ball", this weapon is a ball-shaped bomb which the Fiveman pass to each other, storing energy and kicking them towards the enemy. This technique was based on Ken's dodgeball (Episode 30) Five Red is primarily the one to finish this technique, though the others have occasionally done so as well. Five Yellow used this technique twice (Episode 31 and 43) and never used by Five Black
: This is the first finishing technique of the Fivemen. At the voice of Five Red saying "Sibling Warrior's Brother Attack!!", Five Yellow ties the enemy with the Melody Tact and the rest attack in order with their special weapon, finishing with a blow of Five Red's V-Sword.
Five Black and Yellow also use an attack called Twin Action as a Finisher (Episode 5 and 36), once with Five Blue (Episode 14).

Vehicles
 : Fivemen's motorcycles numbered 1 through 5. They reach speeds of 330 kilometers per hour and are equipped with Hawk Cannons.
 : Five Red's motorcycle.
 : Five Blue's motorcycle.
 : Five Black's motorcycle.
 : Five Pink's motorcycle.
 : Five Yellow's motorcycle.
 : A single hovercraft used by the Fivemen. The number is 0.

Mecha
: It forms with Sky Alpha (piloted by Five Red), Carrier Beta (piloted by Five Black and Five Yellow) and Land Gamma (piloted by Five Blue and Five Pink) when the command  is given. It was badly damaged in episode 44 along with the Star Five when the giant robot Big Garoan defeated the Super Five Robo. It returned in episode 47 to fight Black Gorlin.
: It can transform to a tractor cab when the Five Trailer is being formed. It has Alpha Lasers as its weapons. It forms the head and body of the Five Robo. It appeared again in Gaoranger vs Super Sentai.
: It is armed with the Beta missiles. It forms the majority of the Five Trailer's trailer unit and the legs of the Five Robo (Five Black's half is the right, and Five Yellow's half, the left).
: It has Gamma Cannons as its weapons. It forms the tail end of the Five Trailer's trailer unit and the arms of the Five Robo (Five Blue's half is the right and Five Pink's half, the left).
When the command  is given, the sides become the lower legs, with the landing wheels as the back. The rear of the underside forms the upper legs, the cockpit forms the shield, gun, and back, and the frontal underside becomes the arms. The Star Five can also suspend enemies in the air with its . It forms the helmet, body, arms and lower legs of the Super Five Robo. This ship is built by Doctor Hoshikawa to use it when returning to Earth. It was stolen by Gunther but eventually given back to the Fivemen. It was heavily damaged in episode 44 when the giant robot Big Garoan defeated the Super Five Robo. It returned in episode 46 to battle the monster Rose / Dolgin.
: The combination of the Five Robo and the Star Five into a powerful robot. The two robots combine when the command  is given. The Star Five's lower legs becomes the Super Five Robo's foot and lower legs, what increases the robot's size to roughly 1.4 times the Five Robo's size. The upper legs, along the back landing wheels forms the arms (despite the fact of his hands seems to be "real", closed hands in the series, and not the Star Five's four-segmented upper legs like in the toy). The Star Five's arms and body makes the body armor (with the Star Five's cabin as the chest) and the helmet. The Star Five's shield and gun components do not join in the formation. It was first used to destroy the monster Bar-rugin. It was temporarily destroyed in episode 44 by the giant robot Big Garoan, but it returned at episode 47. It was the last standing force to destroy Vulgyre in the end.
: The command center and living quarters of the Hoshikawas. Built by Doctor Hoshikawa, it was used to travel to Sidon and later to escape from there. It launched the other mecha when necessary, and has a powerful defense system with multiple weapons. It was destroyed by Vulgyre with ease.
: The combination of the Super Five Robo and the Magma Base when the command  is given. Being primarily a base, this robot cannot walk like the Super Turbo Builder in Kousoku Sentai Turboranger. It was first used to destroy the monster Crab / Ant-gin. It was destroyed by Vulgyre in the finale.

Allies 
 : A support robot created by Doctor Hoshikawa, Arthur was the one who raised the orphaned children on Earth, becoming the closest thing they had to their parents. He usually aids Fiveman from the Magma Base but at times he can fly out from base and transform into Earth Cannon.
But arriving on Earth, Gunther battled the Fiveman but eventually could make friends with Gaku before he returns the Star Carrier to them and then was turned to stone. However, he was but was unintentionally revived by Iwakasekigin's spell and helps Gaku while he is trapped with Vulgyre. He sacrifices himself to save Gaku from Billion, and reveals in his dying breath his sins and receive forgiveness before he dies.
 : These plush dolls first appeared in episode 23, from a parallel dimension. The five members are Red-kun, Blue-kun, Black-kun, Pink-chan, and Yellow-chan. While watching TV, Fivemen must assist the plush dolls. They made a few more cameos in the series, watching certain scenes in the episodes and expressing their thoughts of it.

Silver Imperial Army Zone
The  is an alien army plotting to rule the entire Milky Way, it flies across universe attacking worlds with its Galactic Warriors. Earth will be its 1,000th destroyed planet, at which point Meadow will gain eternal life. They operate from their ship Vulgyre and can send smaller battleships called . They use the Galactic currency Dolyen (combination of dollar and Yen) which is said to be equal to 100 Japanese yens.

  (46-48): The true ruler of Zone. Even though being a living organism, he operated as the Zone headquarters, . Projecting into the sky the face of a dead alien woman named Meadow, who he was in love with and killed for refusing him, Vulgyre gave orders to Zone under the "Ōkubi" persona of Empress Meadow. Vulgyre had been traveling the galaxy in order to destroy a total of 1,000 stars. When the star number 1000 is destroyed, he would obtain eternal life and become "God" of the Milky Way. When Five Red exposed the truth, Vulgyre goes on the offensive on the city until he is exposed to New Town School's Sidon flowers and crashes into the mountainside where he confirms his identity. From there, Vulgyre forcefully combines Doldora and Zaza to destroy the Earth-grown Sidon flowers. Believing the one thing that can kill him is gone, Vulgyre reveals to the rest of Zone that he would be undergoing his "Galactic Eclosion", in which he would become "Super Galactic Beast" and that he needed a "final energy" in order to complete this. It is first thought that it is the deaths of the Fiveman but the truth was uncovered after Five Red defeated Chevalier: Vulgyre coveted the energy of Chevalier's death, and not Fiveman's, in order to begin his metamorphosis, explaining that Chevalier had committed multiple murders across the galaxy and his soul would be full with the blood of his victims, the source of the "last energy", resulting in the disturbing revelation that he had deceived Chevalier from the very beginning. After hatching, destroyed the Magma Base with remarkable ease. The Sidon Flowers are his weakness as they are the first sprout of new life in the very first planet he destroyed, using them the Fivemen weakened him and was ultimately destroyed by the Super Five Robo in the finale.
  (1-47): The white-skinned, silver-maned, purple-lipped, golden-eyed mystery ruler of the Zone Empire. She is only seen to be the face of a woman surrounded by a silver mane that appears from the sky. Extremely powerful. She seeks to devour life from planets and when the 1,000th is destroyed, she will gain eternal life. Later on, she appeared in reddish form, far more angry after continuous failure of Zone. She is revealed to be a simulation created by Vulgyre after the flowers of Sidon destroyed her. The real Meadow was an alien woman Vulgyre wanted to be his queen in galactic conquest but refused. In the end, her spirit helped the Sidon flowers destroy Vulgyre once and for all avenging herself for all the wrongs Vulgyre did in her name.
 : The captain of Vulgyre in black and gray armor over red clothes, armed with a sword. He got scarred by Five Red as a child creating a rivalry between them. An expert swordsman, could handle even the five siblings by himself in battle, with his special technique "Taifuu Shaken" (Typhoon Spinning Sword). Although a field commander, he would not show up much in fight, giving orders from Meadow (actually Vulgyre) to the others but at times shows up to make the lives of the Fivemen miserable if the missions are failing. The continuing failures and the arrival of Chevalier eventually caused Garoa's dismissal, having been assigned the janitor post after his monster Gorilla-Eagle Gin was destroyed when he promised "Meadow" (Vulgyre) the deaths of the Fivemen. He eventually found a secret energy source in Vulgyre, and, unaware of its true nature, he used it on a Gorlin, creating the "Big Garoa", a powerful robotic monster which temporarily destroyed the Super Five Robo, earning him the Captain position back. Even though he tried the hardest to succeed in his plans and, along Dongoros, was the last survivor of Zone, Garoa found his demise trapped in the coffin of Meadow, with his armor destroyed, in the middle of burning Dolyen bills as Vulgyre exploded in the series finale.
 Galactic Commanders: They somewhat are the triumvirate of the Empire only answering to Galois and later to Chevalier. They are the ones who serve as the field commanders of the Zone Empire.
  (1-46): He was probably the best swordsman in the galaxy, white-maned in white armor over blue tights. A lover of liquor and swords, this sadistic left-handed warrior enjoys fighting. When he finds an even minimally weaker foe, he challenges to battle and defeats him. He is bitter rivals with Five Red. He would not hesitate to execute a plan even at the cost of a comrade's welfare. He is scheming and manipulative, most of the time using others to accomplish his goals. This can be seen in the different types of monsters and strategies he chose in contrast to Doldora and Dongoros. While using Sabergin, Billion evolved into the more powerful Saber Billion (サーベルビリオン Sāberu Birion), able to enlarge himself to fight the Five Robo. However, once his weapon was destroyed, Billion returned to normal. After being witness to Rose Dolgin's creation to his disgust of the recent truth, Billion attempts to kill Gaku when Gunther intervene and died as a result. He then battles Five Red one on one in a final duel, shattering his sake bottle and discarding his cape, before he ultimately killed by Five Red in Armor Mode's flying sword thrust attack causing him to explode after he got close to victory.
  (1-46): Scientist and weapons researcher of Zone in gold scorpion-like armor over black tights, she is more of a strategist, although she also has high combat levels. Having a gift for disguise as well, she even fooled Fumiya once posing as a cute girl. She is much less violent than Billion and Dongoros but no less evil. She prefers to let Zaza, her underling, do most of her dirty work, and uses subtle tactics and deceitful monsters as she believes brains work better than direct force. After knowing Vulgyre's true identity and going into insanity, Doldora was forcefully united with Zaza by him to become  to destroy the Sidon flowers in the New Town School by converting them into red roses with Five Black, Blue, Yellow and Pink powerless to stop her. With only one remaining, she goes after Tatsuya as he runs off with it. But Gaku arrives to stop her with Gunther's aid. She battles the other siblings until Billions is killed and a Gorlin absorbs her. Piloting Star Five, the Fivemen manage to kill Bara Dolgin.
 : A grotesque, short, fat space merchant who enjoys making money (Dolyen bills) and carries an abacus. He prefers to use brute force (which can be seen in his choice of monsters) to accomplish the job but at times he would use subtle tactics as well when necessary like using a Voodoo Monster. In the finale, Dongoros was killed in the explosion of Vulgyre as he was desperately packing all the Dolyens and gold bars he could before fleeing, falling as a victim of his own greed.
  (1-46): Doldora's underling and loyal bodyguard in black tights with purple armor, born from an egg. Zaza was turned into a cyborg by Doldora when just born and swore absolute servitude to her. She used to operate along Billion at times. She is rivals with Remi. She does most of Doldora's dirty work and does not question her mistress at all. Attempting to shield Doldora from Vulgyre, she was merged with her mistress.
  (28-47): He is actually Vulgyre's first captain but ironically younger-looking than Garoa suggesting he might be a gifted child himself. He had been gone and was operating alone when he heard of Zone's struggle in Earth and returned much to Garoa's chagrin. Eventually takes over captaincy after Galois, becoming Five Red's rival. He controls a black Gorlin. This self-proclaimed "Hero of the Galaxy" enjoys music and has sword abilities that surpass even those of Garoa's.  When he first appeared, he sang the 1970s song "Hero" by the Kai Band. Chevalier shows up in battle more often than Garoa. He is scheming and sadistic as well as cool and even humorous. He uses extremely dangerous tactics against the Fiveman and makes their lives twice as miserable. In the finale, he challenges Five Red to a "Chain Deathmatch" in which an unbreakable chain would link them together until one of them died. He lost to Five Red and then Vulgyre revealed that he made Chevalier fight to death because he needed the "Energy of the most powerful death in the Galaxy" and deceived Chevalier in thinking it was Fiveman's deaths when it was really his that was needed. His explosion released the final energy for Vulgyre's final transformation.
 Weapons: Barok Stick, Barok Fencer, Barok Shoot, Barok Byoot
  (9 & 28-47): A comedic all male evil Squadron of five aliens who first formed by Doldora as part of her plan to hypnotize the masses. But they would later return to serve Chevalier. They were killed by the Fivemen near finale. Not to be confused with 1998's Super Sentai series, Seijuu Sentai Gingaman.
 : From planet Baikan.
 : From planet Monome.
 : From planet Grachis.
 : From planet Fujimin.
 : From planet Gringa.
 : The black-skinned grunts with orange heads, armed with crab claws, bearing the Zone crest on their chests. They are also capable of disguise.  is their leader. Their name comes from the "batsu" (cross) on their heads. There was a special Batzler, Number 339 who had a turtle-like shell. In episode 26, The group Became Superior Over Galois and the Triumvirate During Topsy-Turvy Day. The group were later summoned by Zaigan during Super Sentai World.
 : A giant white-skinned robot alien which absorbs and mimics the defeated Galactic Warriors. Even though, if the Galactic Warrior had completely died, the Gorlin would not be able to mimic it. Each Gorlin has its serial number and there have been interesting cases: Gorlin number 13 combined itself with the Sidon demon warped around it instead of absorbing it; Gorlin number 12 fell down while running and could not reach Bat-rugin before he died, failing to enlarge him; Gorlin number 36 was used by Galois to create the giant robot Big Garoa. Each Gorlin costs 100,000 Dolyen, considerably cheap given its dimensions. It resembled Michelin's mascot Bibendum a little bit.
  (30 & 47): A special Gorlin Chevalier had modified to serve him as a fighting robot. It has laser cannons on its shoulders and bears the Zone crest on its chest. It was destroyed before the finale by two consecutive Super Vector Punches from the Super Five Robo at the same time that Chevalier fell against Five Red.

Galactic Warriors

Combined Galactic Warriors

Episodes

Cast
 Gaku Hoshikawa: 
 Ken Hoshikawa: 
 Fumiya Hoshikawa: 
 Kazumi Hoshikawa: 
 Remi Hoshikawa:  (credited as 
 Doctor Hoshikawa: 
 Midori Hoshikawa: 
 Gunther: 
 Meadow: 
 Garoa: 
 Billion: 
 Doldora: 
 Zaza: 
 Chevalier:

Voice actors
 Arthur G6: 
 Meadow: 
 Dongoros:  (1-4),  (5-48)
 Vulgyre: 
 Garoa-don: ,  (24)
 Narration: 
 Sara: Youko Nakamura

Guest Stars
 Yuriko: Youko Nakamura (Episode 35)

Tagalog Dub Cast
In the ABS-CBN/RPN Tagalog dubbed version, their Japanese names are renamed except the villains while for ABC/TV5's Tagalog dub version had both Gaku and Fumiya renamed as Manabu and Fumio except for Ken, Remi and Kazumi and the names of the villains are maintained. So far, here are the voice cast in the ABC/TV5 version.

ABC/TV5 Dub (2001-2002)
William/Manabu/Gaku Hoshikawa - Bernie Malejana
Ben/Ken Hoshikawa - Bobby Cruz
Julio/Fumio/Fumiya Hoshikawa - Ed Belo
Rita/Kazumi Hoshikawa - Candice Arellano (1-31) Vilma Borromeo (32-48)
Jessica/Remi Hoshikawa - Gloria "Ollie" De Guzman
Doctor Hoshikawa - Roger Aquino
Midori Hoshikawa - Rodelia Legaspi
Wolfe/Gunther - Carlo Eduardo Labalan
Empress Meadow - Marichu Villegas
Garoa - Jun Legaspi
Billion - Allan Ortega
Doldora - Amy Panopio
Dongoros - Bambam Labalan
Chevalier - Montreal "Monty" Repuyan
Zaza - Minna Bernales
Arthur G6 (voice) - Bambam Labalan

Songs
Opening Theme

Lyrics: Masao Urino
Composition: Yasuo Kosugi
Arrangement: Kenji Yamamoto
Artist: 

Ending Theme

Lyrics: Masao Urino
Composition: Yasuo Kosugi
Arrangement: 
Artist: Kenji Suzuki

International Broadcasts and Home Video
Fiveman was aired in France as the sixth Super Sentai series to air in the country on TV with a French dub on June 12, 1991 on TF1's Club Dorothée block. 23 episodes were actually dubbed, but only the first five episodes were aired on the network likely due to low interest as viewership declined towards the Super Sentai series in the region. 
In Thailand, two Thai dubs are said to exist. One for Channel 7 where they used the original title and one for home video released by Video Square where it was released under the international Sky Rangers title. 
In the Philippines, the series was very popular and it has aired with two Tagalog dubs throughout its history run the region. It first aired on ABS-CBN from 1993 to 1994 and later re-aired on RPN from 1997 to 1998 and a new Tagalog dub was made for ABC (now TV5) and aired from 2001 to 2002. 
In Hong Kong, the series aired on TVB Jade with a Cantonese Chinese dub on June 20, 1998 until February 13, 1999 with all episodes being dubbed and broadcast. 
In Indonesia, the series was dubbed in Indonesian and broadcast on RCTI and also later on Indosiar.
In North America, the series would receive a DVD release by Shout! Factory on September 6, 2022 in the original Japanese audio with English subtitles, although it is only available sold exclusively on their website. This is the second Super Sentai series to be officially released on DVD that does not have a Power Rangers counterpart. The DVD is set to be released in other DVD retailers besides the Shout! Factory website on April 18, 2023.

Appearances in Power Rangers
Despite never being directly adapted for a Power Rangers counterpart series, FiveYellow's suit was still adapted into the Power Rangers Megaforce episode "The Wrath" as the Yellow Supersonic Ranger. The entire Fiveman team appeared later in a comic story Power Rangers Supersonic which is in the Boom! Studios Power Rangers Year Two Deluxe Edition. In the story, the team is composed of Ace (Red Ranger), Star (Pink Ranger), Gent (Black Ranger), Pyre (Yellow Ranger), Brute (Blue Ranger) with a Green Ranger named Trek being added to the team. They are also aliens from the planet Xybria. Trek betrays the team and murders them. He would later become Psycho Green the first Psycho Ranger.

References

External links
 Chikyu Sentai Fiveman at the Official Super Sentai website 

Super Sentai
1990 Japanese television series debuts
1991 Japanese television series endings
TV Asahi original programming
1990s Japanese television series
Elementary school television series
TV5 (Philippine TV network) original programming
Radio Philippines Network original programming
Television series about educators
Television series about families
Television series about siblings